Matija Bećković (born 29 November 1939) is a Serbian poet, writer and academic.

Life
Bećković was born in Senta, in the multiethnic province of Vojvodina (then Danube Banate, Kingdom of Yugoslavia), to a military family of Montenegrin Serbs. Bećković's father Vuk was an officer in the Royal Yugoslav Army, and during World War II the commander of the Rovci Chetnik Battalion and as such, one of the commanders of the leader of the Montenegrin Chetniks, Pavle Đurišić. His father was killed in 1945.

He graduated from the Valjevo Gymnasium in Valjevo in 1958. It was during his gymnasium years in Valjevo that he published his first poem, in the journal 'Mlada Kultura'. Furthermore, it was also in Valjevo that Bećković met Vera Pavladoljska, to whom the poem of the same name, published in 1960, was dedicated. Bećković went on to marry Pavladoljska, and he remained married to her until her death.

Upon graduating from the Valjevo gymnasium, he entered the University of Belgrade, graduating with a degree in Yugoslav and world literature. He became a corresponding member of the Serbian Academy of Sciences and Arts in 1983, becoming a full member in 1991.

Bećković is a close friend of Serbian former Prime Minister Vojislav Koštunica, and an active supporter of his Democratic Party of Serbia.

He has been living in Belgrade since 1960. On the Montenegrin independence referendum, 2006, Bećković did not have a right to vote since he lives in Serbia. However, as a prominent Serb nationalist he fiercely advocated against Montenegrin independence, actively supporting the State Union during the pre-referendum campaign.

In April 2022, Bećković signed a petition calling for Serbia not to impose sanctions on Russia after it invaded Ukraine.

Poetic style
A distinguishing feature of Bećković's poetry is its regionalism. Distinctly Serbian archaic dialect and phraseology permeate his work. This aspect of his work is most often lost when one reads it in translation.

Awards and recognitions 
 Grand Cross of the Order of the White Eagle, 2007
 Order of Saint Sava
 Order of Marko Daković
 Radoje Domanović Award
 Marko Miljanov Award, Montenegro
 Milan Rakić Award
 Desanka Maksimović Award
 Njegoš's Award
 Marko Miljanov Award, Montenegro
 Felix Romuliana Award
 Honorary citizen of Subotica
 October Award
 7 July Award
 Prosveta Award
 Duško Trifunović Award
 Vinaver's wreath
 Velika povelja Brankovog kola

Works

Vera Pavladoljska
Metak Lutalica
Tako je govorio Matija
Dr. Janez Paćuka o međuvremenu
O međuvremenu
ČE: Tragedija koja traje (Published in English as CHE: Permanent Tragedy)
Reče mi jedan čoek
Međa Vuka Manitoga
Lele i kuku
Dva sveta
Poeme
Služba Svetom Savi
O Njegošu
Kaža
Čiji si ti Mali?
Nadkokot
Služba
Sabrane pesme
Kosovo najskuplja srpska reč
Ćeraćemo se još
Kad budem mlađi (Published in English as: When I'm Younger)
Misli
Bez niđe nikoga
Put kojeg nema
Služba pustinjaku cetinskom
Besede
Tri poeme
Prahu oca poezije
Sto mojih portreta
Mojih 80
Crna Gora - ime jedne vere

References

 Bećković, Matija. Izabrane Pesme i Poeme. Belgrade: Bigz, 1990.
 Petković, Novica. "Twentieth century literature". Essays on Modern Serbian Bards. Ralph Bogert, Ed. Toronto: University of Toronto Press, 2006.

External links

 Bećković's poems at the South Slavic Library - Mostly in Serbo-Croat, one English translation.
 Translated works by Matija Bećković
 MATIJA BECKOVIC at royalfamily.org

1939 births
Living people
People from Senta
Serbian male poets
Serbian monarchists
Serbian nationalists
Serbian people of Montenegrin descent
Members of the Serbian Academy of Sciences and Arts
Eastern Orthodox Christians from Serbia
Christian writers
Serbian writers
University of Belgrade Faculty of Philology alumni
Recipients of the Order of St. Sava
Poets laureate